Paulo Roberto do Carmo (born 12 March 1985), known as Paulão in Brazil, or di Carmo in Iran, is a Brazilian football striker who currently plays for Uberlândia Esporte Clube.

Club career

CENE and Rio Preto
Paulão started his professional football career with lower league side Centro Esportivo Nova Esperança in 2006. In total, he scored 5 league goals and 11 amateur cup goals for them during his time at the club. In 2007, he was loaned out to São Paulo club Rio Preto Esporte Clube and played in the Campeonato Paulista Série A2 league, where he won promotion with the club; nevertheless he returned to CENE.

Brawl in Iran
In September 2008 he was loaned out to reigning Iranian league title winners Persepolis.
His appearance in Persepolis was protested hardly by fans and media in Iran who questioned the pedigree of the signing. He was believed as an inapt & amateur player after being unable to convert numerous chances and was only able to score a single goal against Foulad in a 3–2 defeat.

Cosa, Brazilian assistant coach of Persepolis who introduced him to the club claimed that he has scored 17 goals in 21 matches in Brazilian league, although this claim made controversies and not proven yet. 
on November 4 and November 11, his career information on Wikipedia and Brazilian Football Confederation Website was shown by Adel Ferdosipour at Navad.
after pressure of criticism by fans and media, Paolao claimed that he has played for CR Vasco da Gama. On November 9, he and Cosa would both be fired from the club.

Ituiutaba 
Paulão would go on to be loaned out to second tier Iranian club Kowsar F.C. and then regional Brazilian side Atlético Sorocaba before second tier Brazilian side Ituiutaba decided to permanently buy Paulão in 2011. In his debut season at Ituiutaba he would go on to make 9 appearances and score 2 goals before the club allowed Paulão to join Chinese Super League side Nanchang Hengyuan during the league season.

References

External links 
 Profile at websoccerclub.com

1985 births
Living people
Brazilian footballers
Clube Atlético Sorocaba players
Uberlândia Esporte Clube players
Persepolis F.C. players
Expatriate footballers in Iran
Shanghai Shenxin F.C. players
Chinese Super League players
Expatriate footballers in China
Brazilian expatriate footballers
Brazilian expatriate sportspeople in China
Association football forwards
Footballers from São Paulo (state)